Forbestown (formerly, Boles Dry Diggins and Forbes Diggins) is a census-designated place in Butte County, California.  It lies at an elevation of 2772 feet (845 m). Its zip code is 95941 and its area code is 530. Forbestown had a population of 320 at the 2010 census.

Forbestown is named for B.F. Forbes, who opened a store there in 1850. The post office was established in 1854, closed in 1925, and re-opened in 1936.

Forbestown's heyday was the last half of the nineteenth century, when it was a large mining center. By the late 1930s, it was nearly a ghost town. The site has foundations and debris from its mining era.

Demographics

The 2010 United States Census reported that Forbestown had a population of 320. The racial makeup of Forbestown was 262 (81.9%) White, 4 (1.3%) African American, 15 (4.7%) Native American, 10 (3.1%) Asian, 0 (0.0%) Pacific Islander, 4 (1.3%) from other races, and 25 (7.8%) from two or more races. Hispanic or Latino of any race were 23 persons (7.2%).

The Census reported that 320 people (100% of the population) lived in households, 0 (0%) lived in non-institutionalized group quarters, and 0 (0%) were institutionalized.

There were 138 households, out of which 28 (20.3%) had children under the age of 18 living in them, 78 (56.5%) were opposite-sex married couples living together, 15 (10.9%) had a female householder with no husband present, 3 (2.2%) had a male householder with no wife present.  There were 10 (7.2%) unmarried opposite-sex partnerships, and 0 (0%) same-sex married couples or partnerships. 32 households (23.2%) were made up of individuals, and 17 (12.3%) had someone living alone who was 65 years of age or older. The average household size was 2.32.  There were 96 families (69.6% of all households); the average family size was 2.71.

The population was spread out, with 57 people (17.8%) under the age of 18, 16 people (5.0%) aged 18 to 24, 53 people (16.6%) aged 25 to 44, 119 people (37.2%) aged 45 to 64, and 75 people (23.4%) who were 65 years of age or older.  The median age was 52.3 years. For every 100 females, there were 105.1 males.  For every 100 females age 18 and over, there were 97.7 males.

The homeowner vacancy rate was 5.2%; the rental vacancy rate was 0%.  246 people (76.9% of the population) lived in owner-occupied housing units and 74 people (23.1%) lived in rental housing units.

Government

See also

Ponderosa Fire, 2017
North Complex Fire, 2020

References

Census-designated places in Butte County, California
Census-designated places in California